No Justice is a country band in the United States.

No Justice may also refer to:
 "No Justice", a song on the 2016 mixtape Campaign by Ty Dolla Sign
 "No justice, no peace", a political slogan
 "No Justice, No Pants," an 2007 episode of the American sitcom Just Jordan

See also
 No Peace Without Justice, an Italian nonprofit organization